The 2012 Formula 3 Euro Series season was the tenth and the final season championship year of the Formula 3 Euro Series.

Drivers and teams
Competition numbers 30 and higher are single-race entrants and are ineligible to score championship points.

Race calendar and results
 A provisional nine-round calendar was announced on 25 November 2011. On 2 April 2012, the calendar was reduced to eight events as series organisers decided to change the meeting due to be held at Lausitzring to Brands Hatch and drop another event, at Oschersleben. All eight rounds will be part of the revived ten-round FIA European Formula 3 Championship, and will also support Deutsche Tourenwagen Masters events.

Notes

Championship standings
The third race at the Norisring was red-flagged after half the race had been completed due to torrential rain. As a result, series organisers only awarded half points to each of the classified finishers eligible to score points. Similarly, half-points were awarded in the second race at Zandvoort, as only five laps were completed within the allotted time limit for racing.

Drivers' Championship

† — Drivers did not finish the race, but were classified as they completed over 90% of the race distance.

Teams' Championship

Nations Cup

Notes

References

External links
The official website of the Formula 3 Euro Series

Formula 3 Euro Series seasons
European
Formula 3 Euro Series